Brabin is the surname of the following people:
Charles Brabin (1882–1957), American film director and screenwriter
Daniel Brabin (1913–1975), judge of the High Court of England and Wales 
Gary Brabin (born 1970), English football player and manager 
Tracy Brabin (born 1961), British politician, actress, and television writer 

English-language surnames